Sidney Township is one of thirteen townships in Fremont County, Iowa, United States.  As of the 2010 census, its population was 1,741 and it contained 767 housing units.

Geography

Cities, towns, villages
 Anderson
 Sidney

Cemeteries
The township contains Abshire Cemetery, Acord Cemetery, Benson Cemetery, Fremont County Cemetery, Grandview Cemetery, Hume Cemetery, Knox Cemetery, Lacy Cemetery, Parsley Cemetery, Rector Cemetery, Redd Cemetery and Sidney Cemetery.

Transportation
 Iowa Highway 2
 U.S. Route 275

School districts
 Sidney Community School District

Political districts
 Iowa's 3rd congressional district
 State House District 23
 State Senate District 12

References

External links
 City-Data.com

Townships in Iowa
Townships in Fremont County, Iowa